Fisher Peak is a  mountain summit located in the Fisher Range of Kananaskis Country in the Canadian Rockies of Alberta, Canada. Fisher Peak is the highest point in the Fisher Range, so its nearest higher peak is Mount Evan-Thomas,  to the southwest in the Opal Range. Precipitation runoff from the mountain drains west into Evan-Thomas Creek, which is a tributary of the Kananaskis River, or east into the Little Elbow River which is a tributary of the Elbow River.

History
The peak was named in 1920 after John Arbuthnot Fisher, 1st Baron Fisher, a British admiral known for reforming and modernizing the Royal Navy prior to World War I. Jackie Fisher, as he was commonly known, has been considered the second most important person in British naval history. The mountain's toponym was officially adopted by the Geographical Names Board of Canada in 1924.

The first ascent of the mountain was made in 1950 by J.F. Tarrant.

Geology
Fisher Peak is composed of sedimentary rock laid down during the Precambrian to Jurassic periods. Formed in shallow seas, this sedimentary rock was pushed east and over the top of younger rock during the Laramide orogeny.

Climate
Based on the Köppen climate classification, Fisher Peak is located in a subarctic climate with cold, snowy winters, and mild summers.

See also

 List of mountains in the Canadian Rockies
 Geography of Alberta

References

External links
 Climbing Fisher Peak: Explor8ion.com
 Fisher Peak photo: Flickr
  

Three-thousanders of Alberta
Canadian Rockies
Alberta's Rockies